"Once upon a time" is a stock phrase used to introduce a narrative of past events, typically in fairy tales and folk tales. It has been used in some form since at least 1380 (according to the Oxford English Dictionary) in storytelling in the English language and has started many narratives since 1600. These stories sometimes end with "and they all lived happily ever after", or, originally, "happily until their deaths".

The phrase is common in fairy tales for younger children. It was used in the original translations of the stories of Charles Perrault as a translation for the French "", of Hans Christian Andersen as a translation for the Danish "", (literally "there was once"), the Brothers Grimm as a translation for the German "" (literally "it was once") and Joseph Jacobs in English translations and fairy tales.

The phrase is also used in retellings of myths, fables and folklore.

Other languages
The "story-starting phrase" is a common feature of many languages.

{| class="wikitable collapsible"
! scope="col" | Language
! scope="col" | Common beginning 
! scope="col" | Common beginning (English translation)
! scope="col" | Common ending
! scope="col" | Common ending (English translation)
|-
! scope="row" | Albanian
|  || Once there was...
|  ||  And they lived happy forever
|-
! scope="row" | Afrikaans
|  || One day, a long time ago...
|  || Whistle, whistle, the story is done
|-
! scope="row" | Moroccan  Arabic
|  || I've told you what's coming
| وخبيرتي مشات من واد لواد وانا بقيت مع الناس الجواد || And my tale went from valley to valley and I remained with the good people.
|-
! scope="row" | Amharic
|  ||Once a long time ago... 
|  || Return my story and feed me bread.(It is a way of saying tell me a story for the one I have told you.)
|-
! scope="row" | Classical Arabic
| 
()
| There was, oh what there was (or there wasn't) in the oldest of days and ages and times...
| توتة توتة خلصت الحدوتة حلوة ولا ملتوتة ||   the tale has finished, sweet/nice and not twisted
|-
! scope="row" | Armenian (Eastern)
|  || There was, there was not...
| || 3 apples fall from the sky/heaven - one for the writer/author, one for the storyteller, one for the listener Note: (the three apples can "be given" to different people, when people tell stories they change the three to whatever they like. The version noted here is the most common/known)
|-
! scope="row" | Armenian (Western)
|  || There was, there was not...
|  (}|| 3 apples fall from the sky/heaven - one for the writer/author, one for the storyteller, one for the listener Note: (the three apples can "be given" to different people, when people tell stories they change the three to whatever they like. The version noted here is the most common/known)
|-
! scope="row" | Assamese
|  || Long time ago...
| Unknown || Unknown
|-
! scope="row" | Asturian
|  || There was once...
|  || And so the tale is finished.
|-
! scope="row" | Azeri
|  || There was, (and) there was not...
| Unknown || Unknown
|-
! scope="row" | Basque
|  || Once upon a time...
| 
| ... and it was or it was not, come in in the pumpkin and come out in the square of... (name of a town).
|-
! scope="row" rowspan="2"| Bengali
|  || Once there lived a king
| rowspan="2" |  || rowspan="2" | My story ends and the spinach is eaten by the goat. (cf A Goat eats the root of a herb unlike cows, so being consumed by goats figuratively means something being irreversibly ended.)
|-
| || In some country, there was...
|-
! scope="row" | Breton
|  || Once upon a time...
| 
| ...and they lived happily and had many children.
|-
! scope="row" rowspan="2"| Bulgarian
| rowspan="2"|() 
| rowspan="2"| There was, once upon a time...
| || ...and they lived happily until the end of their days
|-
| 
| ...and for three days they ate, drank and had fun.
|-
! scope="row" rowspan="5" | Catalan
|  || There was a time...
| 
| Here's a cat, here's a dog, this tale is already melted. And here's a dog, here's a cat, this tale is finished.
|-
|  || Time was time...
| 
| And they were happy and they ate candies.
|-
|  || This was and was not...
| 
| Tale told, tale finished
|-
|  || This went and was...
| 
| And they lived many years of happiness.
|-
|  || This occurred in those ancient times
|  
| They were very happy, had many children, and still would live if they had not died
|-
! scope="row" | Chinese (Mandarin)
| T: S: P: Hěnjiǔ hěnjiǔ yǐqián|| A very very long time ago...
| T: S: P: Cóngcǐ, tāmenguòzhe xìngfú kuàilè de rìzi|| ... and they lived a happy life
|-
! scope="row" | Chinese (Classical)
|  Xīzhě || Anciently...
| - || -
|-
! scope="row" | Croatian
|  || There was once a...
|  || ...and they lived happily until the end of their lives.
|-
! scope="row" rowspan="3" | Czech
|  || There was, there was not...
|  || ...and they lived happily until they died.
|-
|  || There was once a ...
|  || ...and if they have not died yet, they still live there today.
|-
|  || Beyond seven mountain ranges, beyond seven rivers . . . 
|  || A bell rang and the tale comes to its end.
|-
! scope="row" rowspan="2" | Danish
|  || There was, once...
|  || And they lived happily until the end of their days.
|-
|  || Once a long time ago...
|  || And if they're not dead, they are still alive.
|-
! scope="row" rowspan="2" | Dutch
|  || Once there was...
|  || ...and they lived long and happily.
|-
|
|
|  
| And then came an elephant with a very long snout, and it blew the story out (over). 
|-
! scope="row" rowspan="2" | Esperanto
|  || Once there was...
| 
| Their misery was ended and they lived together joyfully.
|-
|  ||In a time already long past,when it was still of use to cast a spell…
| 
| Nothing was lacking to their happiness until their death.
|-
! scope="row" rowspan="2"  | Estonian
|  || There once lived a...
|  || ...and they lived happily until the end of their lives.
|-
|  || Behind seven lands and seas there lived a...
|  || ...and if they're not dead, they still live happily.
|-
! scope="row" rowspan="2" | Faroese
|  || Once there was...
|  || and they lived happily all their days.
|-
|
|
|  || snip, snap, stout, then the story was out.
|-
! rowspan="2" scope="row" | Filipino
|  || At the beginning of time... /  At the first time...
| 
| And they lived peacefully and prosperously.
|-
|
|
|Wakas.
|[The] end.
|-
! scope="row" rowspan="2" | Finnish
|  || Once there was...
| 
| And they lived happily until the ends of their lives.
|-
|
|
|  || That's the length of it.
|-
! scope="row" rowspan="2" | French
|  || There was one time / There was once...
|  || ...and they lived happily and had many children.
|-
|
|
|  ||...and they lived happily until the end of time.
|-
! scope="row" rowspan="2" | German
|   || Once there was...
| 
| ...and if they haven't died, they are still alive today.
|-
|  ||Back in the days when it was still of help to wish for a thing,...
| 
| ...and they lived happily and contentedly until the end of their days.
|-
! scope="row" | Georgian
|
| There was, and there was not, there was...
| 
()
| Disaster there, feast here... bran there, flour here...
|-
! scope="row" | Goemai (Nigeria, West Chadic)
| Unknown ||(Story teller begins in a sing song voice) "Story, Story".  The children reply "Story"
A long time ago... / In the days of our ancestors / When men were men and women tended the kitchen
|  || My tale has finished, (it) has returned to go (and) come home.
|-
! scope="row" | Greek (Modern)
|
| Once and a time... (time = epoch/era/age)
(or)
Once upon a time and once upon an era 
| 
| And they lived well, and we lived better
|-
!Guarani
|Oiko va'ekue petei
|There used to be a 
|Heta ara rire otopa tembiapo ha upei rire oiko porã vy'apope
|After some days he found a job his life changed and he was truly happy ever after 
|-
! scope="row" rowspan="3" | Gujarati
|
| This is an old story.
| Unknown || Unknown
|-
|  || In one era, ...
| Unknown || Unknown
|-
|  || A long back
| Unknown || Unknown
|-
! scope="row" rowspan="2" | Hebrew
| || Once there was...
| 
| And they lived in happiness and wealth to this very day.
|-
| || Once there were...
|  || 
|-
! scope="row" rowspan="2" | Hindi
|   || In one era, ...
| Unknown || Unknown
|-
|
| It's an old story, ...
|  || 
|-
! rowspan="4" scope="row" | Hungarian
|  || Once there was, where there wasn't, there was a...
|  || This is the end; run away with it.
|-
| ... Hetedhétországon is túl, az Óperenciás tengeren is túl, az üveghegyeken is túl, hol a kurtafarkú malac túr||[Optional, signifying distance] 
... cross seven countries, through the sea of Operencia, through the glass mountains, where the curly-tailed pig delves
| ||
|-
|
|
|
|They lived happily until they died.
|-
|
|
|Aki nem hiszi, járjon utána!
|Whoever doesn't believe it shall investigate.
|-
! scope="row" rowspan="3" | Icelandic
|   || Once a long time ago...
|  || And they lived happy for the rest of their lives.
|-
|  || Once there was...
|   || A cat in the bog put up his tail and there ends the fairytale.
|-
| || 
| 
| Cat out in the swamp, lifted its tail, the adventure is finished.
|-
! scope="row" | Indonesian
|  || A long time ago...
| Dan mereka hidup bahagia selama-lamanya. || And they lived happily ever after.
|-
! scope="row" rowspan="2" | Iraqw (Tanzania, Kenya, Cushitic)
|  || Once upon a time
| Unknown || Unknown
|-
| In oral literature: 
| I remember something that our father told me and that is this:
| Unknown || Unknown
|-
! scope="row" | Irish
|  || It was long long ago. If I was there that time I would not be here now. But as I am I have one small story. As I have it today may you have it seven thousand times better tomorrow. May you only lose a pair of the incisors by it, five of the grinders and a fine strip of the gum.
| Ghabh siadsan an t-áth, agus ghabh mise an clochán. Báthadh iadsan agus
tháinig mise. Níor thug siad dom ach brógaí páipéir agus bainne reamhair! ||
|-
! scope="row" | Italian
|  || There was once...
|  || And they lived happy and content.
|-
! scope="row" | Japanese
| 
| Long ago, long ago...
|
| So blissful
|-
! scope="row" | Kannada
|  || Once, in a long past age,...
| Unknown || Unknown
|-
!Kazakh
|Ерте ерте ертеде, ешкі жүні бөртеде

(erte erte ertede, eshki zhuni bortede)
|Direct translation: "A long, long time ago, when goat's wool was grey". Meaning: "A long long time ago, when goats had feathers")
|
|
|-
! scope="row" rowspan="2" | Khroskyabs (Sichuan, Qiangic)
|  || Long, long ago
|  || My story has finished
|-
| || 
|  || Was that fun?
|-
! scope="row" rowspan="2" | Korean
| || On an old day, in the old times,
| || And they lived happily after then.
|-
| || Back when tigers used to smoke tobacco.
| ||
|-
! scope="row" | Koti (Mozambique, Bantu)
|  || Once upon the time, there was a truly great friendship...
| Unknown || Unknown
|-
! scope="row" | Kurdish
| 
ھەبوو نەبوو (ڕۆژێ لە ڕۆژان)
| Once there was and there was not, there was...
| 
| My story went to other homes, God bless the mothers and fathers of its listeners
|-
! scope="row" | Kyrgyz
| || A long, long time ago...
| Unknown || Unknown
|-
!Ladino
|Avia de ser...
|There once was...
|
|
|-
! scope="row" | Latin
|  || At that time, Once
| Unknown || Unknown
|-
! scope="row" | Latvian
|  || Once long ago in times long gone
| Unknown || Unknown
|-
! scope="row" rowspan="4" | Lithuanian
|  || Once upon the time
|-
|  || Beyond nine seas, beyond nine lagoons
| 
| And I was there, drank some mead ale, dribbled through my beard, had not in my mouth
|-
|  ||Once long, long ago
|-
|  ||There was, and there was not
|-
! scope="row" | Luxembourgish
|
| Once there was...
|  || ...and if they haven't died yet, they are still living today.
|-
! scope="row" | Macedonian
|
| Once upon the time there was...
| Unknown || Unknown
|-
! scope="row" | Malayalam
|  || Long ago, at a place...
| Unknown || Unknown
|-
! scope="row" | Malay
|  || Once upon a time
|  || They lived happily ever after.
|-
! scope="row" | Marathi
|
| in a very old time...
| || and they lived happily ever after
|-
! scope="row" | Maragoli
|  || In olden days
| Unknown || Unknown
|-
! scope="row" | Maltese
|  || Once upon a time...
|  || And they lived happily and contentedly ever after.
|-
! scope="row" | Nepali
|  || Once in a country...
|  || A golden–garland to the listener, A flower–garland to the narrator; This story shall go to Vishnu's abode (Heaven), And come back hot (fresh) on someone else's (the next narrator) lips. (Said in a rhyme.)
|-
! scope="row" rowspan="3" | Norwegian
|  || There was, once...
|  || And then they lived happily for the remainder of their days.
|-
| || 
|  || And if they're not dead, they still live.
|-
| || 
|  || Snip, snap, snute (snout), then this adventure is finished. (sometimes the English is translated to rhyme "Snip, snap, snout, this adventure is told out.")
|-
! scope="row" | Occitan
|  || There was one time / There was once...
|  ||  
|-
! scope="row" rowspan="2" | Pashto
| || There was this work that...
| Bas || The End
|-
| || There was this work that...
| Bas || The End
|-
! scope="row" rowspan="2" | Persian
|  || Someday, sometime, ...
|  || This book has come to end,(but) the story yet remains.
|-
| 
| Someone was, someone wasn't, ...
| 

|| Our tale has come to end,(but) the crow hasn't arrived at his house.
|-
! scope="row" rowspan="2" | Polish
|  || (A long, long time ago,) beyond seven mountains, beyond seven forests... 
|  || ...and they lived long and happily.
|-
|  || Beyond seven mountains, beyond seven rivers... 
| 
| ...and I was there [usually at a wedding] too, and drank mead and wine.
|-
! scope="row" | Portuguese
|  || There was, once...
|  || ...and they lived happily forever.
|-
! scope="row" | Qiang
|  || A long long time ago...
| Unknown || Unknown
|-
! scope="row" | Romanian
|  || There once was, (as never before)... because if there wasn't, it wouldn't have been to told
|  || ...and they lived happily until old age.
|-
! scope="row" rowspan="2" | Russian
| || Long, long time ago...
|
| ...and they lived long and happily [and died on the same day]
|-
| 
()
| (In the three-ninth kingdom, in the three-tenth realm) There lived, there was...
|... и стали они жить поживать, да добра наживать.

(i stali oni zhit' pozhivat', da dobra nazhivat''')
|... and they lived and prospered.
|-
! scope="row" rowspan="2" | Sanskrit
|  || In the ancient time...
| Unknown || Unknown
|-
|  || Once upon the time, At any time
| Unknown || Unknown
|-
! scope="row" | Scots
| In the days o lang syne || Long ago 
| Unknown || Unknown
|-
! scope="row" | Scottish Gaelic
|  || A day that was here
| || (and that's still how it is) until the present day.
|-
! scope="row" rowspan="2" | Serbian
|;
()
| Once, a long time ago...
| 
| ...and they lived happily for the rest of their lives.
|-
| (fem.)
(masc.)
(neuter)
| There once was one...
| 
| ...and they lived long and happily.
|-
! scope="row" | Shona
|  || A long time ago, there existed
| Ndopanoperera sarungano || End of the story.
|-
! scope="row" rowspan="5" | Slovak
|  || Where it was, there it was...
|  || ...and they lived together happily, until they died.
|-
|  || Beyond the hills, beyond the valleys...
|  || ...and they lived together happily until their deaths.
|-
|  || Beyond seven mountains and seven valleys...
|  || ...and if they haven't died already, they are living happily to this day.
|-
|  || Where the water was being strewn and the sand poured...
|  || The bell chimed and the tale came to its end.
|-
|  || Once, there was a...
| 
|-
! scope="row" rowspan="2" | Slovene
|  || A long time ago...
| 
| ...and they (both) lived happy until the end of their days.
|-
|  || Once upon a time there was/lived...
| 
| ... and they (all) lived happily until the end of their days.
|-

! scope="row" | Somali
| Sheeko, sheeko, sheeko xariir... || Story, story, a story of silk... 
| 
|-

! scope="row" rowspan="2" | Spanish
|  || There was, once...
|  || ...and they lived happy and ate partridges.
|-
|  || There was, once...
|  || ...and redhead, red,  this tale has ended. 
|-
! scope="row" | Swahili (east African)
|  || A long time ago
| Unknown || Unknown
|-
! scope="row" rowspan="2" | Swedish
|  || Once, there was...
|  || ...and then they lived happily for all of their days.
|-
|  || Once, long ago...
| Snipp snapp snut, så var sagan slut || Snip, snap, snute (snout), thus the story ends.
|-
! scope="row" | Tagalog
|  || Back in the old time...
|  || And they lived happily.
|-
! scope="row" | Tamil language
|  || At a time long ago
| Subham || The End.
|-
! scope="row" | Telugu language
| || Once upon a day...
| Subham/ Kadha Kanchi ki || The End.
|-
! scope="row" | Thai
|
| Once upon the time (long ago)...
| 
()
| And they lived happily forever.
|-
! scope="row" | Turkish
| 
| Once there was, and once there wasn't. In the long-distant days of yore, when haystacks winnowed sieves, when genies played jereed in the old bathhouse, [when] fleas were barbers, [when] camels were town criers, [and when] I softly rocked my baby grandmother to sleep in her creaking cradle, there was/lived, in an exotic land, far, far away, a/an...*

∗ : This traditional opening phrase by the storyteller is rich with rhyming wordplays, tongue-twisters, as well as comedic and bizarre situational juxtapositions that are meant to draw listeners in, and set the stage for a whimsical, fantastical storyline.
| 
 Alternatively:

| Lastly, three apples fell from the sky; one for our story's heroes, one for the person who told their tale, and one for those who listened and promise to share. And with that, they* all achieved their hearts' desires. Let us** now step up and settle into their thrones.***
Alternatively:
Lastly, three apples fell from the sky; one for those who know to keep their inner child alive, one for those who know to listen and think before they act, and one for those who never lose the love and hope within their soul. And with that, they* all achieved their hearts' desires. Let us** now step up and settle into their thrones.***

∗ : the protagonists of the story
∗∗: the listeners
∗∗∗: a common conclusory storytelling expression meaning "may we all share in their good fortune"
|-
! scope="row" rowspan="2" | Ukrainian
| || Long, long time ago...
|
| ...and they lived long and happily.
|-
| 
()
| (In some kingdom, in some land) There lived, there was...
| ||
|-
! scope="row" | Urdu
|
بہت بہت سال پہلے۔۔۔ 

(Bohut bohut sal pehle...)
| Once upon a time...

Many many years ago...
| Unknown || Unknown
|-
! scope="row" | Vietnamese
|  || A long, long time ago...
| ...và họ sống hạnh phúc mãi mãi về sau || ...and they live happily ever after
|-
!Yiddish
|אַמאָל איז געווען אַ מעשׂה (Amol iz geven a mayse)
|Once there was a story
|
|
|-
! scope="row" | Welsh
|  || A long time ago...
| Unknown || Unknown
|}

 Modern variants 
 Don McLean's "American Pie" begins with the phrase "A long, long time ago...".
 All of the Star Wars films, as well as several of the expanded universe novels, begin with the phrase "A long time ago in a galaxy far, far away....".
 The musical Into the Woods begins with the Narrator's line, "Once upon a time." The second act commences with his line, "Once upon a time... later..." The musical is a retelling of many famous fairy tales.
 In the Singaporean comedy series Under One Roof, Moses Lim's character Tan Ah Teck begins his stories with "Long before your time, in the southern province of China ...".
 In the 2010 Edgar Wright film Scott Pilgrim vs. the World, the opening scene narrates the words "Not so long ago, in the mysterious land of Toronto, Canada."
 The opening line of the theme song to MST3k is: "In the not-too-distant future ... next Sunday, A.D."
 Bionicle features the line "In the time before time...".
 The opening line of the TV series Merlin features the line "In a land of myth, and a time of magic..."
 The first episode of Ivor the Engine'' opens with the line "Not so very long ago, in the top left-hand corner of Wales..."

See also
In the beginning (phrase)
All's Well That Ends Well
Happy ending
It was a dark and stormy night

References

External links 

Folktale Openings 

English phrases
Recurrent elements in fairy tales
Traditional stories
Redirects from opening lines